The Twentieth Dynasty of Egypt (notated Dynasty XX, alternatively 20th Dynasty or Dynasty 20) is the third and last dynasty of the Ancient Egyptian New Kingdom period, lasting from 1189 BC to 1077 BC. The 19th and 20th Dynasties furthermore together constitute an era known as the Ramesside period. This dynasty is generally considered to be the start of the decline of Ancient Egypt.

History

Background
Upon the death of the last pharaoh of the 19th Dynasty, Queen Twosret, Egypt descended into a period of civil war, as attested by the Elephantine stela built by Setnakhte. The circumstances of Twosret's demise are uncertain, as she may have died peacefully during her reign or been overthrown by Setnakhte, who was likely already middle aged at the time.

20th Dynasty 
A consistent theme of this dynasty was the loss of pharaonic power to the High Priests of Amun. Horemheb, a pharaoh of the 18th Dynasty, had restored the traditional Ancient Egyptian religion and the priesthood of Amun after their abandonment by Akhenaten. With the High Priests now acting as intermediaries between the gods and the people, rather than the pharaoh, the position of pharaoh no longer commanded the same kind of power as it had in the past.

Setnakhte 
Setnakhte stabilized the situation in Egypt, and may have driven off an attempted invasion by the Sea Peoples. He ruled for about 4 years before being succeeded by his son Ramesses III.

Ramesses III 
In Year 5 of his reign, Ramesses defeated a Libyan invasion of Egypt by the Libu, Meshwesh and Seped people through Marmarica, who had previously unsuccessfully invaded during the reign of Merneptah.

Ramesses III is most famous for decisively defeating a confederacy of the Sea Peoples, including the Denyen, Tjekker, Peleset, Shardana and Weshesh in the Battle of Djahy and the Battle of the Delta during Year 8 of his reign. Within the Papyrus Harris I, which attests these events in detail, Ramesses is said to have settled the defeated Sea Peoples in "strongholds", most likely located in Canaan, as his subjects.

In Year 11 of Ramesses' reign, another coalition of Libyan invaders was defeated in Egypt.

Between regnal Year 12 and Year 29, a systematic program of reorganization of the varied cults of the Ancient Egyptian religion was undertaken, by creating and funding new cults and restoring temples.

In Year 29 of Ramesses' reign, the first recorded labor strike in human history took place, after food rations for the favored and elite royal tomb builders and artisans in the village of Set Maat (now known as Deir el-Medina), could not be provisioned.

The reign of Ramesses III is also known for a harem conspiracy in which Queen Tiye, one of his lesser wives, was implicated in an assassination attempt against the king, with the goal of putting her son Pentawer on the throne. The coup was unsuccessful. The king died from the attempt on his life, however it was his legitimate heir and son Ramesses IV who succeeded him to the throne, who thereafter arrested and put approximately 30 conspirators to death.

Ramesses IV 
At the start of his reign Ramesses IV started an enormous building program on the scale of Ramesses the Great's own projects. He doubled the number of work gangs at Set Maat to a total of 120 men and dispatched numerous expeditions to the stone quarries of Wadi Hammamat and the turquoise mines of the Sinai. One of the largest expeditions included 8,368 men, of which some 2,000 were soldiers. Ramesses expanded his father's Temple of Khonsu at Karnak and possibly began his own mortuary temple at a site near the Temple of Hatshepsut. Another smaller temple is associated with Ramesses north of Medinet Habu.

Ramesses IV saw issues with the provision of food rations to his workmen, similar to the situation under his father. Ramessesnakht, the High Priest of Amun at the time, began to accompany state officials as they went to pay the workmen their rations, suggesting that, at least in part, it was the Temple of Amun and not the Egyptian state that was responsible for their wages.

He also produced the Papyrus Harris I, the longest known papyrus from Ancient Egypt, measuring in at 41 meters long with 1,500 lines of text to celebrate the achievements of his father.

Ramesses V 
Ramesses V reigned for no more than 4 years, dying of smallpox in 1143 BC. The Turin Papyrus Cat. 2044 attests that during his reign the workmen of Set Maat were forced to periodically stop working on Ramesses' KV9 tomb out of "fear of the enemy", suggesting increasing instability in Egypt and an inability to defend the country from what are presumed to be Libyan raiding parties.

The Wilbour Papyrus is thought to date from Ramesses V's reign. The document reveals that most of the land in Egypt by that point was controlled by the Temple of Amun, and that the Temple had complete control over Egypt's finances.

Ramesses VI 
Ramesses VI is best known for his tomb which, when built, inadvertently buried the tomb of pharaoh Tutankhamun underneath, keeping it safe from grave robbing until its discovery by Howard Carter in 1922.

Ramesses VII 
Ramesses VII's only monument is his tomb, KV1.

Ramesses VIII 
Almost nothing is known about Ramesses VIII's reign, which lasted for a single year. He is only attested at Medinet Habu and through a few plaques. The only monument from his reign is his modest tomb, which was used for Mentuherkhepeshef, son of Ramesses IX, rather than Ramesses VIII himself.

Ramesses IX 
During Year 16 and Year 17 of Ramesses IX's reign famous tomb robbery trials took place, as attested by the Abbott Papyrus. A careful examination by a vizierial commission was undertaken of ten royal tombs, four tombs of the Chantresses of the Estate of the Divine Adoratrix, and finally the tombs of the citizens of Thebes. Many of these were found to have been broken into, like the tomb of Pharaoh Sobekemsaf II, whose mummy had been stolen.

Ramesses IX's cartouche has been found at Gezer in Canaan, suggesting that Egypt at this time still had some degree of influence in the region.

Most of the building projects during Ramesses IX's reign were at Heliopolis.

Ramesses X 
Ramesses X's reign is poorly documented. The Necropolis Journal of Set Maat records the general idleness of the workmen at this time, due, at least in part, to the danger of Libyan raiders.

Ramesses XI 
Ramesses XI was the last pharaoh of the 20th Dynasty. During his reign the position grew so weak that in the south the High Priests of Amun at Thebes became the de facto rulers of Upper Egypt, while Smendes controlled Lower Egypt even before Ramesses XI's death. Smendes would eventually found the Twenty-First dynasty at Tanis.

Decline

As happened under the earlier Nineteenth Dynasty, this dynasty struggled under the effects of the bickering between the heirs of Ramesses III. For instance, three different sons of Ramesses III are known to have assumed power as Ramesses IV, Ramesses VI and Ramesses VIII respectively. However, at this time Egypt was also increasingly beset by a series of droughts, below-normal flooding levels of the Nile, famine, civil unrest and official corruption – all of which would limit the managerial abilities of any king.

Pharaohs of the 20th Dynasty
The pharaohs of the 20th Dynasty ruled for approximately 120 years: from c. 1187 to 1064 BC. The dates and names in the table are mostly taken from "Chronological Table for the Dynastic Period" in Erik Hornung, Rolf Krauss & David Warburton (editors), Ancient Egyptian Chronology (Handbook of Oriental Studies), Brill, 2006. Many of the pharaohs were buried in the Valley of the Kings in Thebes (designated KV). More information can be found on the Theban Mapping Project website.

Timeline of the 20th Dynasty

Pharaonic Family tree
The Twentieth Dynasty of Egypt was the last of the New Kingdom of Egypt. The familial relationships are unclear, especially towards the end of the dynasty.

Gallery of images

See also 

Pharaoh is a historical novel by Bolesław Prus, set in Egypt at the end of the Twentieth Dynasty, which adds two fictional rulers: Ramesses XII and Ramesses XIII. It has been adapted into a film of the same title.

References 

 
States and territories established in the 12th century BC
States and territories disestablished in the 11th century BC
20
New Kingdom of Egypt
12th century BC in Egypt
11th century BC in Egypt
12th-century BC establishments in Egypt
2nd-millennium BC disestablishments in Egypt
20
Late Bronze Age collapse